The Lille Metro is a driverless light metro system located in Lille, France. It was opened on 25 April 1983 and was the first to use the VAL system. While often referred to as the first fully automated driverless metro of any kind in the world, the Port Liner in Kobe, Japan predates it by two years.

The system forms part of a multi-modal public transport system covering the Lille metropolitan area, along with buses and trams, operated under the Ilevia brand.

History 
In the 1960s the decentralisation of the city of Lille was considered; some towns of the Lille region were isolated and were poorly served by existing public transport, while the centre of Lille was congested with traffic and buses. The decentralisation resulted in the creation of the Public Establishment of Lille East development (EPALE) in 1968. In the 1970s, a plan for a proposed four line light metro system was developed, favouring the VAL system over conventional rail systems.

Construction of Line 1 
Construction started in 1978, and the first section was opened on 25 April 1983 between Quatre Cantons ("Four Townships") and République. All 18 stations have platform screen doors.

Line 2 opened on 3 April 1989 and it connects Lille with its two large suburban towns, Roubaix and Tourcoing, reaching CH Dron (centre hospitalier: "hospital centre") near the Belgian border on 27 October 2000.

Line 1 extension and the creation of a second line
While line one opened in April 1983 between 4 Cantons and République; it was extended, with the extension from République and C.H.R. B Calmette opening on 2 May 1984. The cost of opening the first line in both its phases cost about 2 billion Francs. 

Construction of line two began in April 1985. A depot was opened on the second line at Villeneuve d'Ascq, after the terminus of the line Saint Philibert in Lomme. Line one became operational in late 1988 with testing being carried out for four months. In 1989, COMELI which runs the metro merged with COTRALI, which runs the bus and tram networks into a unified public transport body.

The section between Lille and neighbouring towns of Roubaix and Tourcoing was built and opened in four stages.

It became operational in March 1999 and commissioned on 18 August that year. This section goes through the towns of Villeneuve d'Ascq, Wasquehal, Croix, Roubaix and stops in downtown Tourcoing. Though the route is mainly underground, the metro runs on a  viaduct between the stations of Fort Mons and Jean-Jaures. The final section was inaugurated on 27 October 2000 by Prime Minister Lionel Jospin.

Plans for third and fourth lines
While a system of four lines was initially planned in the 1970s only two lines have been built. Lille Métropole Urban Community (now called CUDL) indicates in its urban transport plan (PDU) adopted in June 2000 that 'the subway construction cost does not allow new achievements'. In 2003 a third line was estimated to cost €810 million; a cost considered prohibitive so the city explored surface networks instead; making investments in its bus and tram systems. In 2010, the vice president of urban transport, Eric Quiquet confirms this decision by stating that the LMCU 'plans no more new metro lines' and that 'the priority is the development of the network of buses, urban tramway, the tram-train'.

Map

Operations 

Each unit can carry 156 passengers.

The metro operates from 5:00 a.m. until midnight, with trains every 1½ to 4 minutes (every 66 seconds during rush hour), and every 6 to 8 minutes early mornings and evenings. On Sundays there is a train every 2 to 6 minutes. A one-way ticket costs €1.80.

Planned capacity expansion 
Since January 2013, work to double the capacity of Line 1 has been ongoing. This expansion should be complete in autumn 2017. The former VAL 208 of the first line will then be transferred to Line 2 to increase its passenger capacity as well.

Gallery

See also 
 Lille tramway
 List of metro systems

References

External links 

 Interactive Lille Metro Map
 Ilevia 
 Lille at UrbanRail.net 
 Lille VAL Automated Urban Metro 

Transport in Lille
Buildings and structures in Lille
Rapid transit in France
VAL people movers
Urban people mover systems
People mover systems in France
Railway companies established in 1978
Underground rapid transit in France
Railway lines opened in 1983